Beata Szalwinska (Polish: Beata Szałwińska), is a Polish pianist, known for her classical music concerts in Poland, Germany, Belgium, Denmark, France, Luxembourg, and Switzerland, living since 1999 in Luxembourg.

Early years 
 1972-1980: Ecole de musique Emil Mlynarski  in Warsaw (Poland)
 1980-1985: Józef Elsner Secondary Music School with  Anna Radziwonowicz in Warsaw, Poland
 1980-1985:  Master of Arts - Frederic Chopin Academy of Music with professor Barbara Muszynska in Warsaw, Poland
 1992-1993: Ecole Normale de Musique A. Cortot, with Marian Rybicki in Paris.
 1992-1994 : ‘’Conservatoire de Musique d’Olivier Messiaen’’ with Sergiei Markarov.

Discography 
 CD of a piano concert with compositions of Ravel, Schubert, Chopin, Skriabin and Szymanowski
 Aconcagua Quintet Beata Szałwińka with compositions of Astor Piazzola
 Aconcagua Project Beata Szałwińska with compositions of Astor Piazzola
 Singiel with Alexander Anisimov with composition "The Doubt" Michaił Glinka
 CD "Her Portrait"

Awards 
 Award for the best interpretation of the IV Symphony of the composer Karol Szymanowski.

"Her very start (pianoconcert:IV Simphonie of Karol Szymanowski) showed a beautiful, calm phrase with almost Chopin-like sound, she charmed with her colourful interpretation. The performance tended to a classical form, but was brought alive by articulation motifs, attractive phrasing and a very fresh approach. Beyond any doubt Beata Szalwinska is a very talented pianist which was confirmed by the standing ovation,": Appreciation by :pl:Krzysztof Baculewski

References

External links 

 Homepage of Beata Szalwinska (reference page)
 Site of the Quintett Aconcagua
 Biography on musiciansgallery

Polish classical pianists
Polish women pianists
Living people
21st-century classical pianists
Year of birth missing (living people)
Women classical pianists
21st-century women pianists